Fan-Tan, or fantan is a gambling game long played in China. It is a game of pure chance.

The game is played by placing two handfuls of small objects on a board and guessing the remaining count when divided by four. After players have cast bets on values of 1 through 4, the dealer or croupier repeatedly removes four objects from the board until only one, two, three or four beans remain, determining the winner.

History

The game may have arisen during third and fourth centuries, during the period of the Northern and Southern dynasties. It then spread through southern China during the Qing dynasty. The name fantan dates back only to the mid-nineteenth century. It was prominent during the Late Qing and Republican period in Canton and the Pearl River Delta region. The game was also played in the Philippines under the name Capona.

After 1850, fantan  spread overseas as a side effect of the massive Cantonese emigration. As a rule, in places where a significant number of Cantonese migrants could be found, fantan was also present. Fan-tan was very popular among Chinese migrants in America, as most of them were of Cantonese origin. Jacob Riis, in his famous book about the underbelly of New York, How the Other Half Lives (1890), wrote of entering a Chinatown fan-tan parlor: "At the first foot-fall of leather soles on the steps the hum of talk ceases, and the group of celestials, crouching over their game of fan tan, stop playing and watch the comer with ugly looks. Fan tan is their ruling passion." The large Chinatown in San Francisco was also home to dozens of fan-tan houses in the 19th century. The city's former police commissioner Jesse B. Cook wrote that in 1889 Chinatown had 50 fan-tan games, and that "in the 50 fan tan gambling houses the tables numbered from one to 24, according to the size of the room."

California amended Section 330 of the California Penal Code in 1885, adding fan-tan to its list of banned games; this coincided with the general rise of anti-Chinese sentiment in the United States, as fan-tan was considered a differentiating vice on par with opium use and the direct cause of property crime and violence. Raids on fan-tan parlors were regularly featured in contemporary news articles, with police in some cases posing as Chinese to infiltrate the games. In San Jose, California, a typo in a local printed law led to charges being dismissed against several bettors. Despite its illegality, it was estimated that 100 fan-tan parlors were operating in San Francisco's Chinatown around the turn of the 20th century.

Because of the police raids, fan-tan parlors adopted double-entrance security measures: after entering through the street doors, a bettor would have to pass through a hallway and a second interior set of doors. If the guard posted on the exterior doors did not recognize the prospective bettor or the guard raised an alarm in the event of a raid, the interior doors, often heavily reinforced with iron, would be shut and barred, giving the fan-tan patrons and parlor time to dismantle the game, conceal evidence, and flee the premises.

Fan-tan is no longer as popular as it once was, having been replaced by modern casino games like Baccarat, and other traditional Chinese games such as Mah Jong and Pai Gow. Fan-tan is still played at some Macau casinos.

The game
The game is operated by two people: the "tán kún" or croupier, who stands by the table at position no. 1, and the "ho kún" (clerk or cashier), who stands to the left of the "tán kún".

A square is marked in the center of an ordinary table, or a square piece of metal is laid on it, the sides being marked 1, 2, 3 and 4 in anti-clockwise order; alternatively, the sides may be marked 0 through 3, with 0 taking the place of 4. The banker puts on the table a double handful of small objects (buttons, beads, coins, dried beans, or similar articles), which he covers with a metal bowl. When all bets are placed, the bowl is removed and the "tán kún" uses a small bamboo stick to remove the objects from the heap, four at a time, until the final batch is reached.

If the final batch contains four objects, those who wagered on position 4 (and specific bets that include position 4) win; if three, the backers of No. 3 win; if two, the backers of No. 2 win and if one the backers of No. 1 win. A variant substitutes dice instead of counting the objects by fours; the remainder after dividing the sum of the dice by four is used to determine the winning positions.

Betting
Fan-Tan uses a fixed-odds betting system where all winning wagers are paid according to the true odds of success. The pool of money used to pay off bets is the total amount wagered on all positions, less a house commission, which ranges from 5% to 25% depending on the time and place. Because the prizes are paid entirely out of the wagers, the game is relatively inexpensive to operate.

Culin (1891) describes four potential bets:
 "Fan", in which the wager is on a single position to win.
 "Hong", in which the wager is on three positions, one of which (the primary bet) is selected to win; if either of the other two positions (the two secondary bets) are selected, the bettor does not lose, but it is considered a push and the bettor's money is returned.
 "Kwok", in which the wager is on two positions (two primary bets); if either is selected, the bettor wins.
 "Nim", in which the wager is again on two positions, one of which is selected to win (one primary bet), and the other (one secondary bet) is selected to push.

In the modern game, the "Hong" (row) bet is usually replaced by two alternative three-number bets. The first of these is the "Tan" or "Nga Tan" bet. Two positions are chosen as the primary wager, and one position is chosen as the secondary "push" wager; there are twelve possible combinations of this type of bet, and each position has six corresponding primary and three secondary wagers.

The second three-number bet that can be made is an all-primary wager, known as "Sheh Sam Hong", sometimes romanized as "Shen Sam Hong" ( or ), where any one of the three numbers will win. The payout for the "Tan" and "SSH" bets is correspondingly lower, based on the increased odds of winning, and the two modern three-number bets also generally require a higher minimum stake because of the lower payout.

Notes

Currently, in Macau casinos, the house commission is uniformly set at 5%. For example, assume that bettors have wagered a total of $100 on each position as "Fan" bets, meaning the total of all wagers is $400 for all positions; the true odds of winning this specific wager are 1 in 4. The total payout to the bettors who chose the winning position would be $400 (the total wagered on all positions). Based on the amount wagered on the winning position, $100, the net payout is 3 to 1: $100 wagered, $300 returned in addition to the original wager. However, the house commission of 5% means the winning bettor(s) are paid a total of $285 ($300 less 5%), providing a total commission of $15 to the house for the game.

Odds and payout

The net payout for each bet is determined by the true odds. The odds of winning for each type of bet is determined by considering the total number of potential bets within that type, and if how many of those bets will win, lose, or push for a given position outcome; the sum of the odds for any single bet (win + lose + push) is always one. The odds of the "push" or secondary positions only affect the calculation of net payout by reducing the number of losing bets because when the result is a push, the original wager is returned without loss.

For example, the "Fan" bet on a single position only wins  of the time, i.e., only when that specific position is selected; consequently, there is a  chance of losing the "Fan" wager. The net payout is  = 3, before the cut for the house is taken. Assuming a 5% cut, the final payout for a "Fan" win is 95% of 3×, or 2.85× the amount bet.

The net return is the product of the odds of winning and final payout (after the cut for the house is taken), less the odds of losing. Again, the odds of a push are not considered.

Equipment
 Numerous small objects (typically copper cash, beads, buttons, or beans)
 Tan ching (playing mat)
 Tan koi (cup or cover)
 Tan pong (stick or rod used to remove objects)

Cultural references
 Rodgers and Hammerstein wrote the song "Fan Tan Fannie" for the 1958 musical Flower Drum Song, although stagings and the subsequent 1961 film literally use hand fans without referencing the game.
 The 2005 novel Fan-Tan was based on concepts developed by actor Marlon Brando and director Donald Cammell. The pair began work in 1979, sequestering together for eight months and working out the dialogue through acting. Cammell prepared an incomplete novel in 1982, but Brando withdrew from the project in 1986 and repaid the advance; the publisher later hired David Thomson to gather the material and complete the novel after the death of both men.
 The third season of the television series GLOW is set in the fictional Fan-Tan Hotel and Casino. In the show, the Fan-Tan is in Las Vegas and is based on the Riviera, where the actual Gorgeous Ladies of Wrestling women's wrestling league and syndicated show was filmed in the 1980s. However, exterior scenes for GLOW were filmed at a hotel near Ontario International Airport in California.

References

External links

Picture of a Fan-Tan set
 . In this video of an online fan-tan game, the croupier starts with an indeterminate number of counters already concealed; as the video progresses, the croupier separates the counters into groups of four, and position no. 4 wins. The bettor in this instance has wagered on two single numbers (position 2 and position 4) and one of the twists (23). The betting board is prominently featured with the following bets and payouts, with the house commission incorporated in the payout:
 "FAN 1:2.85" (1 primary wagered position, "buying a single number", net payout is 2.85 to 1)
 "SSH 3:0.95" (3 primary, "three gates")
 "KWOK 1:0.95" (2 primary, "buying the corner")
 "NIM 1:1.9" (1 primary and 1 secondary, "buying the twist")
 "NGA 2:0.95" (2 primary and 1 secondary, "booth")
 . Position no. 4 wins.

Chinese ancient games
Gambling games